Putnam, the Iron Son of '76 is an 1844 American play by Nathaniel Bannister, and his most popular play.  

The play is about American Revolutionary War hero Israel Putnam.  Starting on August 5, 1844, it played for 78 consecutive nights (not counting Sundays) in New York at the Bowery Theatre, produced by Thomas S. Hamblin, an astounding success for its time, and likely the longest New York run of its time.  It featured the live horse "Black Vulture", which was a big audience draw.  It enjoyed revivals for years, and was also performed in other cities.

Original New York cast
Oneactah by John R. Scott
Major Putnam by George Milner
General Washington by William Alexander Vache
General Cadwallader by Mr. Reeve
General Greene by Mr. Jackson
Major Sapling by E.L. Davenport
Starkham by Thomas Hadaway
William by Mr. Sutherland
Lord Cornwallis by Mr. Fleming
Lord Rawdon by Mr. Lewis
Talbot, the Renegade by Junius Brutus Booth, Jr.
Indian Boy by Mr. Yeoman
Kate Putnam by Mrs. Sutherland
Therese by Mrs. McCluskey
Mrs. Starkham by Mrs. Stickney
Violetah by Mrs. Phillips

External links
Putnam, the Iron Son of '76 (Samuel French, New York)(full text, via Google Books)

References

1844 plays